Monika Leuenberger (born 11 April 1973) is a Swiss ice hockey player. She competed in the women's tournament at the 2006 Winter Olympics.

References

1973 births
Living people
Swiss women's ice hockey defencemen
Olympic ice hockey players of Switzerland
Ice hockey players at the 2006 Winter Olympics
Ice hockey people from Zürich